is a Japanese samurai drama film released in 1969. It was directed by Hiroshi Inagaki and is based on the novel Furin kazan by Yasushi Inoue.

Plot 

Yamamoto Kansuke (Toshiro Mifune) is a general of warlord Takeda Shingen (Nakamura Kinnosuke), whose titular red banners are his trademark. Yamamoto has a ruthless but effective approach to battle and politics, and advises Takeda Shingen on almost everything he does, including the assassination of Suwa Yorishige (Akihiko Hirata). Of Lord Suwa's household, Princess Yu (Yoshiko Sakuma) refuses to commit suicide, and the film comes to center on a love triangle between the lord, his general, and the princess.

The film ends with the fourth Battle of Kawanakajima, in which Yamamoto erroneously believes his battle tactics have failed and commits a pincer attack, but is killed in action before the battle is won.

Cast 
 Toshiro Mifune – Kansuke Yamamoto
 Yoshiko Sakuma – Princess Yuu
 Nakamura Kinnosuke – Shingen Takeda
 Yujiro Ishihara – Kenshin Uesugi
 Katsuo Nakamura – Nobusato Itagaki
 Nakamura Kankurō V – Katsuyori Takeda
 Kan'emon Nakamura – Nobukata Itagaki
 Masakazu Tamura – Nobushige Takeda
 Mayumi Ozora – Princess Okoto
 Masao Shimizu : Yokota Takamatsu
 Ryūnosuke Tsukigata: Kasahara Kiyoshige
 Akihiko Hirata : Yorishige Suwa
 Ryosuke Kagawa : Nagasaka Yorihiro
 Yoshiko Kuga : Dame Sanjō
 Sachio Sakai : Yamagata Masakage
 Akira Kubo : Baba Nobuharu
 Yoshio Tsuchiya : Tsuchiya Masatsugu
 Takashi Shimura – Toramasa Obu
 Ken Ogata : Hatanaka

Release
Samurai Banners received a roadshow release in Japan by Toho on 1 February 1969. It received a wide release in Japan on 1 March 1969. The film was Toho's top-grossing film of the year and the top-grossing film among domestic releases in Japan in 1969.

The film was released in the United States by Toho International under the title Under the Banner of the Samurai on June 24, 1969. It was later released to home video as Samurai Banners.

Reception
"Mosk." of Variety found that "even Mifune's unique presence fails to give this many new twists and provide dynamic stature or the poetic  insights that marked some earlier Japanese films of this genre." The review concluded that "Mifune is spectacular as usual if the film's surface prettiness and melodramatic flourishes, without the deeper classic flair and rightness to make this more than a florid actioner, limit its art potential."

References

Footnotes

Sources

External links

1969 films
Films directed by Hiroshi Inagaki
Jidaigeki films
Samurai films
Films with screenplays by Shinobu Hashimoto
Films produced by Tomoyuki Tanaka
Films scored by Masaru Sato
Films produced by Toshiro Mifune
Films set in the 16th century
Cultural depictions of Takeda Shingen
Cultural depictions of Uesugi Kenshin
1960s Japanese films